One Piece also referred to as Shonen Jump's One Piece is a 2-D platforming beat 'em up video game for the Nintendo Game Boy Advance based on the 4kids dub of the One Piece anime. Developed by Dimps and published by Bandai, it was released on September 7, 2005. It is the only One Piece game to be only released in the USA, and the first out of two to not see a release in Japan.

Plot
"Follow the adventures of Monkey D. Luffy and the Straw Hat Pirates and explore the Grand Line in search of the famed treasure, the "One Piece!" Use your stretchy Gum-Gum abilities to defeat marines and other pirates of the sea that you encounter on your journey!"

Similar to the first One Piece video game, From TV Animation - One Piece: Become the Pirate King!, the main game covers the East Blue Saga.

Gameplay
Control Monkey D. Luffy through platformer styled levels, with a one button masher combo system. Roronoa Zoro, and the other crew members can be used as summons and a total of 15 characters appear in the story mode. There are 12 different bosses such as Buggy and Smoker. There are items that appear in the manga and anime used as collectable treasure, which the player can revisit already cleared stages to find. The stages also have interactive environment objects.

Some characters such as Zoro and Smoker as Zolo and Chaser, as well as collectable treasure such as Sanji's cigarette as "Lollipop" due to match the 4kids dub name.

Reception

The game was met with positive to average reception upon release, as GameRankings gave it a score of 72.30%, while Metacritic gave it 76 out of 100.

Trivia
This game uses some assets from the WonderSwan Color game One Piece Grand Battle: Swan Colosseum, which is a japan-exclusive game.

References

—

External links
Bandai America's Official Website (archived)
One Piece Webgame from Viet Nam

2005 video games
Beat 'em ups
Dimps games
Game Boy Advance games
Game Boy Advance-only games
North America-exclusive video games
One Piece games
Single-player video games
Video games developed in Japan